Ballinger High School is a public high school located in Ballinger, Texas (USA) and classified as a 3A school by the UIL.  It is part of the Ballinger Independent School District located in south central Runnels County.  In 2015, the school was rated "Met Standard" by the Texas Education Agency.

Athletics
The Ballinger Bearcats compete in these sports - 

Cross Country, Football, Basketball, Powerlifting, Golf, Tennis, Track, Softball & Baseball

State Titles
Girls Cross Country - 
2001(3A)

State Finalists
Football -  
1953(2A)

References

External links
Ballinger ISD

Public high schools in Texas